Jakob Friedrich Ehrhart (4 November 1742, Holderbank, Aargau – 26 June 1795) was a German botanist, a pupil of Carl Linnaeus at Uppsala University, and later director of the Botanical Garden of Hannover, where he produced several major botanical works between 1780 and 1793. Ehrhart was the first author to use the rank of subspecies in botanical literature, and he published many subspecific names between 1780 and 1789.

In 1779, Carl Peter Thunberg (1743–1828) named a genus of grasses, Ehrharta, in Ehrhart's honor.

Publications 
 Chloris hanoverana, 1776.
 Supplementum systematis vegetabilium, generum et specierum plantarum, 1781.
 Beiträge zur Naturkunde, und den damit verwandten Wissenschaften, besonders der Botanik, Chemie, Haus- und Landwirthschaft, Arzneigelahrtheit und Apothekerkunst, seven volumes (1787 to 1792) – Contributions to natural history, etc.
 Autobiography in Usteri's Annals of Botany.

References

1742 births
1795 deaths
People from Lenzburg District
Bryologists
Pteridologists
Botanists with author abbreviations
18th-century German botanists
German mycologists